The Women's 800 metres competition at the 1968 Summer Olympics in Mexico City, Mexico. The event were held at the University Olympic Stadium on October 17–19.

Competition format
The competition had four heats in the first round, two semi-finals and a final. The top four in the first round heats progressed. The top four finishers in the semi-final race reached the finals.

Records
Prior to the competition, the existing World and Olympic records were as follows.

Results

Round 1

Heat 1

Heat 2

Heat 3

Heat 4

Semifinals

Heat 1

Heat 2

Final

References

External links
 Official Olympic Report, la84foundation.org. Retrieved August 16, 2012.

Athletics at the 1968 Summer Olympics
800 metres at the Olympics
1968 in women's athletics
Women's events at the 1968 Summer Olympics